Jarena Lee (February 11, 1783 – February 3, 1864) was the first woman preacher in the African Methodist Episcopal Church (AME). Born into a free Black family, in New Jersey, Lee asked the founder of the AME church, Richard Allen, to be a preacher. Although Allen initially refused, after hearing her preach in 1819, Allen approved her preaching ministry. A leader in the Wesleyan-Holiness movement, Lee preached the doctrine of entire sanctification as an itinerant pastor throughout the pulpits of the African Methodist Episcopal denomination. In 1836, Lee became the first African American woman to publish her autobiography.

Early life
Jarena Lee was born on February 11, 1783, in Cape May, New Jersey, according to the details she published later in life in an autobiography. She recounts that she was born into a free black family, but from the age of 7, she began to work as a live-in servant with a white family. Not much detail is known of her family or her early life. As a teenager, she moved from New Jersey to Philadelphia, Pennsylvania, where she continued in domestic service.

Lee later recalled that she did not receive religious instruction as a child.  When she was older, however, she was introduced to Christian teachings during religious revivals, and felt herself to be a "wretched sinner." She recounts that she struggled with suicidal thoughts and fantasized about drowning herself on at least several occasions. Through prayer, she finally felt justified and was baptized. After three months of constant prayer, she felt that she had been fully sanctified by the Holy Spirit.

Call to preach
She soon started hearing voices telling her to "Go preach the Gospel! Preach the Gospel; I will put words in your mouth."  Lee then told Richard Allen that God had spoken to her and commanded her to preach, but Allen said that there was no provision for women preachers in the Methodist Church. This did not stop Lee from pursuing her call. "If the man may preach, because the Savior died for him, why not the woman, seeing he died for her also? Is he not a whole Savior, instead of half of one?" Allen still refused, but eight years later during a Sunday service at the Mother Bethel the preacher seemed to lose spirit. Lee stepped up and began to preach, the crowd was very intrigued to what she had to say. Religious belief, especially in God's divine protection, became a source of self empowerment for Lee. In rebuttal to questions on a female ministry, she responded, "Did not Mary first preach the risen Savior?". The idea that African Americans and women could preach was an element of the Second Great Awakening, which reached its peak as Lee began her missionary work.

Lee left behind an account of her religious experience. The publishing of her autobiography made Lee the first African American woman to have an autobiography published in the United States. Despite Richard Allen's blessing, Lee continued to face hostility to her ministry because she was black and a woman. She became a traveling minister, traveling thousands of miles on foot. In one year alone, she "travelled two thousand three hundred and twenty-five miles, and preached one hundred and seventy-eight sermons."

Converting a non-believer
In the Religious Experience and Journal of Mrs. Jarena Lee there is a story she tells of young man who would ridicule her for what she preached, because he did not believe in God or religion. He was a person of color who would regularly attend her meetings. As time passed he grew ill. The young man's sister, who was a part of the society, called upon Lee to not help him to recover, but in hopes that the Lord would enter into his mind. When Lee went to visit she saw the young man in a very low state. She asked him if he wanted her to pray for him and he replied yes. Although he never recovered, the young man continued to ask for her to be at his bed side to pray for him.

Marriage
Lee came to Philadelphia as a teenager and was changed when she heard a passionate sermon given by Richard Allen. She married Joseph Lee in 1811, seven years after joining Philadelphia's Mother Bethel. Joseph Lee was a pastor of a Society at Snow Hill. Snow Hill was six miles from Philadelphia. Lee moved to Snow Hill with her husband, but was unsure because she knew no one there besides her husband. She found at Snow Hill that she did not find the same closeness that she had in Philadelphia. During their marriage her husband did not want her to preach, so she felt forced to put her spiritual needs on hold for her marriage. It is said that her not being fully committed to her spiritual needs resulted in Lee becoming ill and a sense of discontent. Joseph Lee died six years into their marriage. Soon after Lee was fully devoted to religious concerns, but her ill health never recovered.

Legacy
Lee is recognized as being the first woman to preach in the African Methodist Episcopal (AME) Church. Her life story exemplifies the 19th-century American religious movement's focus on personal holiness and sanctification. She has been compared to influential African American women of her time, such as Maria W. Stewart and Sojourner Truth. In the decades after Jarena Lee became a preacher, other women such as Juliann Jane Tillman gained prominence as evangelists within the AME Church.

Much of what is known about Lee's life comes from her autobiographical memoir, The Life and Religious Experience of Jarena Lee and its expanded version, Religious Experience and Journal of Mrs. Jarena Lee. Extensive archival research by Dr. Frederick Knight has revealed that Jarena Lee died penniless in Philadelphia sometime in early 1864.

Jarena Lee is also currently the subject of a research project at Harvard Divinity School entitled "The Resurrection of Jarena Lee." Womanist Biblical scholar Nyasha Junior is involved with this project.

See also
 Richard Allen
 "Black Harry" Hosier
 Juliann Jane Tillman
Mary G. Evans
Martha Jayne Keys
Amanda Smith

References

Bibliography

External links
 http://voices.cla.umn.edu/artistpages/lee_jarena.php
 https://www.pbs.org/godinamerica/people/jarena-lee.html
 https://www.pbs.org/wgbh/aia/part3/3h91.html
 https://www.nyhistory.org/womens-history/education/curriculum/saving-washington/module-2-breaking-the-rules-women/life-stories/jarena-lee
https://daily.jstor.org/jarena-lee-the-first-woman-african-american-autobiographer/
www.christianitytoday.com/history/people/pastorsandpreachers/jarena-lee.html
www.womenhistoryblog.com/2012/02/jarena-lee.html
www.nyhistory.org/sites/default/files/newfiles/cwh-curriculum/Module%202/Life%20Stories/Jarena%20Lee%20Life%20Story.pdf
https://blog.nyhsdev2.org/sites/default/files/newfiles/cwh-curriculum/Module%202/Life%20Stories/Jarena%20Lee%20Life%20Story.pdf

1783 births
Methodists from Pennsylvania
1864 deaths
19th-century American women writers
American religious writers
Women religious writers
African Methodist Episcopal Church clergy
Methodist circuit riders
Women Protestant religious leaders
19th-century American Methodist ministers
People from Cape May, New Jersey
American women non-fiction writers
19th-century African-American writers
19th-century African-American women writers